The Changtang (alternatively spelled Changthang or Qangtang) is a part of the high altitude Tibetan Plateau in western and northern Tibet extending into the southern edges of Xinjiang as well as southeastern Ladakh, India, with vast highlands and giant lakes. The Changtang is home to the Changpa, a nomadic Tibetan people. The two largest settlements within the Tibetan Changtang are Rutog Town the seat of Rutog County and Domar Township the seat of Shuanghu County.

Climate
The summers are warm but short and thunderstorms can occur at any time of year, often with hail.  The winters are cold and Arctic-like, despite the latitude, due to the high elevation.

History
Changtang was once ruled by a culture known as the Zhangzhung, which later merged with Tibetan culture.

People

The people of the Changtang are nomadic pastoralists, they are known as 'Changpa', for 'northerners,' or 'Drokpa' for 'nomads' in Tibetan.    there were half a million nomads living in Changtang.   Unlike many other nomadic groups, the Changpa are not under pressure from settled farmers as the vast majority of land they inhabit is too inhospitable for farming.

The economy of the region is based around the livestock of the Changpa, and the most important resource is the plants the animals graze on.  The transhumance of the Changpa over one year limits the impact that their animals have on the grazing lands, the grasses of which are dead for eight to nine months of the year, and provide poor fodder during that time.  Unlike many other nomadic pastoralists, the Changpa do not move from one climatic region to another; this allows them to move shorter distances in many cases, in the range of about 10–40 miles.  Migratory routes are established and followed year after year, staying in the same encampments each year, often in camps that have stone walls for corrals and for sheltering the tents.  Wealthier nomads may have buildings for storage and living in for the part of the year they spend at that encampment.

In addition to changing pastures, there are numerous other techniques developed by the Changpa to even out the periods of surpluses and shortages.  Dairy products are converted into less perishable forms (like butter and cheese) during the summer when the livestock are producing high levels of milk.  Animals are slaughtered early in the winter, after fattening up in the summer and while the weather is conducive to storage.

Trade has played an important role for the Changpa as they are not able to produce all the goods they consume.  Salt, meat, live animals, wool, and unprocessed cashmere are traded for basics such as grain, cooking pots, and other metal implements, as well as more modern goods.

Tibetan Changtang

Most of the Tibetan Changtang is now protected nature reserves consisting of the Chang Tang Nature Reserve, the second-largest nature reserve in the world, and four new adjoining smaller reserves totaling  of connected nature reserves that represent an area almost as large as Spain. Since the reserves have been established there has been a welcome increase in the numbers of endangered species. The protected areas stretch across parts of the Tibet Autonomous Region, Xinjiang and Qinghai in China.

Located in the Nagqu prefecture, the average elevation of Tibetan Changtang is as high as 5,000 meters. The Nagqu Horse Festival is the most important festival here.

Ladakhi Changtang

Only a small part of Changtang crosses the border into Ladakh, in India.  It is, however, on a historically important route for travellers journeying from Ladakh to Lhasa, and now has many different characteristics due to being part of India.

As in the rest of Ladakh, Changtang has been experiencing many socio-economical developments since the late twentieth century. Ladakh is one of the regions most exposed to international mass tourism in India. Centuries-old cultural and social fabrics are now changing rapidly, influenced by consumerist and modern lifestyles.  This is becoming a source of both concern and hope for the populace of the region. Another major influence in the region is Tibetan settlement at the behest of the Tibetan government-in-exile.  The settlement was first established in 1963 with almost 3,000 residents but today it has more than 7,000 settlers.  For administrative purposes, the Ladakh settlement is divided into two, Sonamling and Changtang.

The Changthang Wildlife Sanctuary is home to many rare species of flora and fauna, which are  well cared for in this wildlife sanctuary. The sanctuary is located at high altitude in the Leh district of Ladakh.

The Changtang Wildlife Sanctuary is surrounded by Three large and world-famous water lakes, the Tsomoriri, the Tsokar Lake and the Pangong Tso.

Tsomoriri is one of the huge mountain lakes in the southeastern part of Ladakh. The Tsokar Lake lies in the Rupshu valley and it 
is the famous Salt Lake of Ladakh.

The Changtang Wildlife Sanctuary has natural grasslands and a wide variety of more than 200 species of wild plants grow in the higher pastures of this area, most of which is edible for animals.

Hamlets
Changtang hamlets were established when many Tibetan nomads, mostly from western Tibet, fled and settled down in the adjoining places of Ladakh. There are more than 3,500 Tibetan refugees residing in the Changtang region who depend primarily on livestock, with agriculture being their secondary occupation. These nomads were organized into the Tibetan refugee settlements in 1977 by the Central Tibetan Administration, Dharamsala, with help from Government of India and the state government at nine different places: Nyoma, Kagshung, Goyul, Hanley, Sumdho, Samedh, Karnag, Chushul and Churmur. Large areas of Changtang are semi-arid, with very little vegetation growth in the whole region. Agricultural lands and pastures are confined to limited areas along the riverbanks (Yatoo et al., 2014). The average snowfall is less than  occurring usually during the months of December, January and February. Unusual and excess snowfall as happened in March 2012, can be fatal to the livestock of the nomads. Sometimes, goats and sheep cannot get access to the grass for grazing for period up to 15 days. This constitutes the most critical part of the year for the nomads (Yatoo et al., 2014).

Education in Ladakh is looked after entirely by the SOS Tibetan Children Village, one of the non-profit institutions providing education to the Tibetan children.  There is a facility for crèche to tenth standard.  Most of students attend day school, but there are also boarding facilities for very poor students and those from nomadic camps.  Almost all children get a chance to go to school, and the general education level of the children is fairly good. The settlements have one modern allopathic hospital and one Tibetan medical and Astro clinic.  There is also a bird sanctuary.

Changthang Wildlife Sanctuary
The Changthang Wildlife Sanctuary (or the Changthang Cold Desert Wildlife Sanctuary) is a high altitude wildlife sanctuary located in the Ladakhi adjunct of the Changtang plateau in the Leh District, Ladakh. It is important as one of the few places in India with a population of the kiang or Tibetan wild ass, as well as the rare black-necked crane.

The Changtang Cold Desert Wildlife Sanctuary is part of the Hindu Kush Himalaya, the natural enchantress.

There are around 11 lakes and 10 marshes in the Changtang Cold Desert Sanctuary, and the majestic Indus River flows through the sanctuary, dividing it into two parts.

The cold desert  of this wildlife sanctuary is sparse but the marginal conditions have resulted in species with some remarkable characteristics. Seven rare and endangered plants which some believe have medicinal properties were discovered here by C.P. Kala. Three of these species are listed as vulnerable and one as endangered on the IUCN Red List (Arnebia euchroma, Geranium sibiricum, Lancea tibetica, Lloydia serotina, and Ephedra gerardiana).

Other geographic features
The Tso Moriri is among the highest lakes in the world of its size. In November 2002, the lake was designated as a Ramsar site.

The water in India is salty, in China interest not, but in spite of that, during the winter the water freezes.

The Pashmina goat is famous for its ultra fine Cashmere wool. Pasmina in Persian means 'made from wool' and in Kashmiri it translates to 'soft gold'. This breed of goat inhabits the Changthang plateau and therefrom gets its name. Pashmina shawls are hand spun in Kashmir and Nepal.

See also
 Changthangi
 Hoh Xil

References

Namgail, T., Bhatnagar, Y.V., Mishra, C., Bagchi, S. (2007). Pastoral nomads of the Indian changtang: production system, land use and socio-economic changes. Human Ecology, 35: 497-504.
Mohd Iqbal Yatoo, Maheshwar Singh, Syed Shafat Kubrevi, Mir Shabir, Ruksar Dar, Kunzes Angmo (2014). Safeguarding a national asset: a review on problems faced by pashmina farmers in Changthang and their amelioration. Indian Journal of Animal Science. 84(12):1251-1255.

Footnotes 
 Who cares about the Chang-thang?

Landforms of Tibet
Landforms of Ladakh
Plateaus of China
Plateaus of India
Tibetan Plateau